Yevgeny Kafelnikov was the defending champion but did not compete that year.

Andriy Medvedev won in the final 7–5, 6–3 against Martin Damm.

Seeds
A champion seed is indicated in bold text while text in italics indicates the round in which that seed was eliminated.

  Michael Chang (quarterfinals)
 n/a
  Richey Reneberg (second round)
  Jan Siemerink (first round)
  Andriy Medvedev (champion)
  Younes El Aynaoui (second round)
  Hendrik Dreekmann (first round)
  Magnus Larsson (first round)

Draw

References
 1996 Genovese Hamlet Cup Draw

Connecticut Open (tennis)
1996 ATP Tour
1996 in American tennis
1996 in sports in Connecticut
1996 Waldbaum's Hamlet Cup